Freeborn Lake is a lake in Douglas County, in the U.S. state of Minnesota.

Freeborn Lake was named for John Freeborn, a pioneer who settled in the area in 1868.

References

Lakes of Minnesota
Lakes of Douglas County, Minnesota